The Kenya–Uganda–Rwanda Petroleum Products Pipeline is a pipeline that carries refined petroleum products from the Kenyan port city of Mombasa to the country's capital of Nairobi and continues to the town of Eldoret in the Eastern Rift Valley. There are plans to extend the pipeline to Uganda's capital, Kampala, continuing on to Rwanda's capital, Kigali.

Location
The pipeline originates in the Indian Ocean port of Mombasa and travels to Nairobi, continuing to Eldoret. That part of the pipeline is in existence as of May 2014. 

It has been proposed that the pipeline be extended to Kigali, Rwanda, through Kampala, Uganda.

Background
The pipeline extension will connect Eldoret in Kenya to Kampala in Uganda, passing through Malaba. The pipeline will extend to Kigali in Rwanda and possibly to Bujumbura, Burundi in the future. Each country will be responsible for developing the infrastructure within its borders; however, a joint "transaction advisor" will be selected to maintain quality control.

Construction
The feasibility study for the Eldoret to Kampala pipeline extension was awarded to an international firm in 1997. The study was completed in 1998, and the report was submitted the following year. The study was funded by the European Investment Bank. The report indicated that building the pipeline was feasible. The feasibility study for the Kampala to Kigali extension was awarded to the East African Community in September 2011, funded with $600,000 from the African Development Bank. The governments of Kenya, Uganda, and Rwanda accepted the findings of both feasibility studies.

The construction contract was initially awarded, in 2007, to Tamoil, a company owned by the government of Libya. That contract was voided in 2012 after the company failed to implement the project. , fourteen companies have submitted bids to construct the pipeline extension from Kenya to Rwanda. Construction is expected to begin in 2014, with a 32-month construction timeframe. Commissioning is expected in 2016.

Construction costs
The total construction cost for the Eldoret-Kampala-Kigali portion of the pipeline is estimated at approximately US$5 billion. In November 2014, the International Finance Corporation, an arm of the World Bank, pledged to lend US$600 million towards the construction of the Eldoret-Kampala section of the project.

Photographs and diagrams
 Diagram of Existing Pipeline And Proposed Extension

See also

 Uganda Oil Refinery
 Uganda National Oil Company
 Petroleum Authority of Uganda
 Uganda–Kenya Crude Oil Pipeline
 Hoima–Kampala Petroleum Products Pipeline
 Uganda–Tanzania Crude Oil Pipeline

References

External links
 Kenya–Uganda–Rwanda Petroleum Products Pipeline

Proposed energy infrastructure in Africa
Oil pipelines in Kenya
Oil pipelines in Uganda
Oil pipelines in Rwanda
Proposed pipelines in Africa